Filippo Franchi (born 14 January 1998) is an Italian football player who plays for Serie C club Matelica.

Club career

Roma

Loan to Akragas and Reggina 
On 4 August 2017, Franchi was loaned to Serie C club Akragas on a season-long loan deal. On 2 September he made his professional debut in Serie C for Akragas as a substitute replacing Vincenzo Carrotta in the 60th minute of a 3–2 home defeat against Rende. On 16 September, Franchi scored his first professional goal, as a substitute, in the 95th minute of a 2–0 home win over Paganese. On 21 January 2018, Franchi played his first match as a starter for Akragas, a 3–2 home defeat against Monopoli, he was replaced by Marco Saitta in the 79th minute. In late January 2018, Franchi was re-called to Roma leaving Akragas with 16 appearances, only 1 as a starter, 1 goal and 1 assist.

On 31 January 2018, Franchi was signed by Serie C club Reggina on a 6-month loan deal. Franchi ended his loan to Reggina without made any appearances for the club, he was an unused substitute 13 times.

Matelica 
On 26 July 2018, Franchi joined to Serie D side Matelica on a free-transfer.

Chieti
In December 2019 it was confirmed, that Franchi had signed with another Serie D club, Chieti.

Back to Matelica
On 18 August 2020 he returned to Matelica, now in Serie C.

Career statistics

Club

Honours 
Roma Primavera
 Campionato Nazionale Primavera: 2015–16
 Coppa Italia Primavera: 2016–17

References

External links
 
 

1998 births
Footballers from Rome
Living people
Italian footballers
S.S. Akragas Città dei Templi players
Reggina 1914 players
A.C. Tuttocuoio 1957 San Miniato players
Avezzano Calcio players
S.S. Chieti Calcio players
S.S. Matelica Calcio 1921 players
Serie C players
Serie D players
Association football forwards